Ray Donovan: The Movie is an American crime drama television film directed by David Hollander for Showtime. It is the follow-up to the seventh and final season of the series of the same name, which aired in 2020. It centers on the title character, portrayed by Liev Schreiber and the relationships with his family, including brothers Terry, Bunchy and Daryll, played by Eddie Marsan, Dash Mihok and Pooch Hall, respectively. It debuted on January 14, 2022 on Showtime.

Plot
Following from the events of the season 7 finale, Mickey (Jon Voight) is on the run, and Ray (Liev Schreiber) is determined to find and stop him before he can cause any more damage to his family and friends.

Cast
Liev Schreiber as Ray Donovan
Eddie Marsan as Terry Donovan
Dash Mihok as Bunchy Donovan
Pooch Hall as Daryll Donovan
Kerris Dorsey as Bridget Donovan
Katherine Moennig as Lena Burnham
Kerry Condon as Molly Sullivan
Jon Voight as Mickey Donovan
Bill Heck as Young Mickey
Josh Hamilton as Kevin Sullivan
Graham Rogers as Jacob "Smitty" Smith
Alyssa Diaz as Teresa Donovan 
David Patrick Kelly as Matty Galloway
Austin Hébert as Young Jim Sullivan
Chris Gray as Young Ray Donovan
AJ Michalka as Young Abby
Chris Petrovski as Young Sean Walker

Production
In 2020, Showtime abruptly announced that season 7 of Ray Donovan would be the end of the series. Fans of the show petitioned for a follow up to be written after the final season left many questions unanswered. On February 12, 2020, Liev Schreiber wrote on his Instagram, "It seems your voices have been heard. Too soon to say how or when, but with a little luck and your continued support, there will be more Ray Donovan." Following the announcement of a television film followup, in 2021, Showtime's President of Entertainment Gary Levine stated that the audience would be satisfied with the ending of the film, admitting "we did hear from fans, and we are nothing if not responsive to our audience. I think this Ray Donovan two-hour movie will go a long way to making that landing more graceful."

Principal photography began in May 2021 and was wrapped in a few months, with the film shot in New York, Connecticut and Massachusetts.

Reception
Kerris Dorsey received an honorable mention for TVLine's Performer of the Week ending on January 15, 2022.

Critical response
The review aggregator website Rotten Tomatoes reported an approval rating of 87% based on 15 reviews, with an average rating of 6.7/10. The site's critical consensus reads, "If Ray Donovan: The Movie doesn't accomplish everything that a proper final season could have achieved, it nevertheless satisfies with a prologue and epilogue to the fixer's family woes."

Accolades

References

External links
 
 

2022 television films
2022 films
2022 crime drama films
2020s American films
2020s English-language films
American crime drama films
American drama television films
Crime television films
Films based on television series
Films scored by Marcelo Zarvos
Showtime (TV network) films